Janowiczki  is a village in the administrative district of Gmina Racławice, within Miechów County, Lesser Poland Voivodeship, in southern Poland.

The village has a population of 250.

References

Janowiczki